Dan Hett is a digital artist, writer and games designer from Manchester, UK. He is also a member of the Algorave live coding electronic music and visuals movement, performing under the name Rituals.

Career

Hett’s writing is influenced by the death of his younger brother Martyn Hett in the 2017 Manchester Arena bombing. He is known for short introspective autobiographical narrative games and interactive fiction, which explore radicalisation, extremism and identity politics in the UK. His work The Loss Levels has been exhibited at Now Play This festival in London and Sheffield DocFest.

Until 2016 Hett worked in the BBC Children’s and R&D departments, where he developed apps and digital games across a range of languages and platforms. He was technical lead on the CBeebies Storytime app, he also designed and built the core of the BBC’s first cross-platform multiplayer games API.

He founded a small independent games studio PASSENGER GAMES in 2018, which produced the game Closed Hands.

In 2021 Hett became Creative Technologist at the School of Digital Arts, Manchester Metropolitan University.

Awards 

 2015, Broadcast Digital Awards Winner of Best Digital Children’s Content for CBeebies Storytime
 2015 British Academy of Film and Television Arts Winner of Children’s Interactive award for The Dumping Ground
 2020 New Media Writing Prize winner for c ya laterrrr

Works

Interactive Fiction 

 c ya laterrrr, 2017
 The Loss Levels, 2018
 Sorry To Bother You, 2018
 Closed Hands, 2021

Non-fiction 

 My Brother Martyn Seized Every Moment - This Christmas, We All Should Too, 2017, Huffington Post
 More games should be truly honest about death, 2018, Rock, Paper, Shotgun
 Show, Don't Tell, 2019, FutureEverything
 Dreams becomes reality: the game that can make an artist out of anyone, 2019, The Guardian
 Online hate threatens us all. Platforms can and must do more to eradicate it, 2019, The Guardian
 Love, loss, and virtual memorials, 2020, Observer

Reviews 

 Alan Wen (5 March 2021). "Closed Hands Review". TheSixthAxis. 
 Mostyn Jones (22 March 2021). "Review: Closed Hands at HOME, Manchester (online)". Exeunt Magazine.

References

External links 

 Official website
 Dan Hett's creator page on Itch.io

21st-century English writers
Year of birth missing (living people)
Algorave
Live coding
Living people
Electronic literature writers